Lieutenant General Ajay Kumar Singh, PVSM, AVSM, SM, VSM is the former Lieutenant Governor of Andaman and Nicobar Islands. He is an alumnus of Sainik School Rewa and National Defence Academy. He is former Commander in Chief of Southern Command of Indian Army.

Singh was named 11th Lieutenant Governor of Andaman and Nicobar Islands in July 2013 and took office on 8 July 2013. He was given additional responsibility of the administration of Puducherry from July 2014 to May 2016.

Singh is known for his contributions towards Andaman Society by starting Andaman's first medical College, ANIIMS and second degree college of South Andaman, ANCOL.

Singh left the Andaman and Nicobar Islands after handing over charges on 19 August 2016.

Awards and decorations

References

Lieutenant governors of the Andaman and Nicobar Islands
Lieutenant Governors of Puducherry
Indian generals
Living people
Sainik School alumni
National Defence Academy (India) alumni
1953 births
Recipients of the Param Vishisht Seva Medal
Recipients of the Ati Vishisht Seva Medal
Recipients of the Sena Medal
Recipients of the Vishisht Seva Medal